Máquina de sangre (Blood machine) is the eighth album by Argentine rock band Los Piojos, released in 2003.

Track listing 
 «Fantasma» [Ghost]
 «Guadalupe» [Guadalupe]
 «Como Alí» [Like Alí]
 «Langostas» [Lobsters]
 «Sudestada» [Sudestada]
 «Motumbo» [Motumbo]
 «Entrando en tu Ciudad» [Entering Your City]
 «Amor de Perros» [Love of Dogs]
 «Solo y en Paz» [Alone and Peacefully]
 «Dientes de Cordero» [Lamb Teeth]
 «Al Desierto» [To the Desert]
 «Canción de Cuna» [Lullaby]
 «No Parés» [Don't Stop]

External links 
 Máquina de sangre 

2003 albums
Los Piojos albums